Skryne GFC is a Gaelic Athletic Association club based in the Village of Skryne, in County Meath, Ireland. The club mainly plays Gaelic Football. It competes in Meath GAA competitions. Skryne has the second most Meath Senior Football Championship titles after Navan O Mahony's. Every All-Ireland Winning Meath team has had a Skryne player as a panel member. Skryne have never been relegated from Senior level in the football championship.

2010 season

Skryne finished second in the Senior Football Championship Group B. And went on to win against Seneschalstown in Páirc Tailteann on 26 September. The final score was Seneschalstown 4-8 - 0-21 Skryne, giving Skryne their 13th Meath Football Championship title.

Officers
Chairman – Dan O' Leary
Vice Chairman – Eamon Giles
Secretary – Sennan McGrath.
Assistant Secretary – Ray Mooney
Treasurer – Michael Mulvaney
Assistant Treasurer – Caroline Whelan
PRO – Joseph O' Brien
Co. Board Delegate – Oliver Harrington
Insurance Officer – Pat McCabe,
Membership Officer/ Registrar – Caroline Whelan
Safety Officer & Irish Language Officer – Kevin O' Rourke
Children's/Schools Protection Officer – Eddie McCormack

Honors

Meath Senior Football Championship: 13
1940, 1941, 1944, 1945, 1947, 1948, 1954, 1965, 1992, 1993, 1999, 2004, 2010
 Meath Intermediate Football Championship: 1
 1933

Notable players
 Trevor Giles
 Ciarán Lenehan
 John McDermott
 Paddy O'Brien
 Colm O'Rourke
 Mick O'Dowd
 Liam Hayes

External links

Gaelic games clubs in County Meath